{{Infobox Sailing yacht
|title=Comanche
|image=Comanche in the Rolex Transatlantic Race 2015 leaving Newport RI for Plymouth England--C.jpg
|caption=Comanche at the start of the 2015 transatlantic race
|club=
|nat=
|type=Monohull 
|class=100 Supermaxi
|designer=VPLP and Guillaume Verdier
|builder= Hodgdon Yachts
|launched=
|owner=
|skip= 
|crew=
|wins=
|boats=
|P=
|displacement=
|length=
|beam=
|draft=
|sail=
|notes=
}}Comanche'' is a 100 ft (33 m) maxi yacht. She was designed in France by VPLP and Guillaume Verdier and built in the United States by Hodgdon Yachts for Dr. James H. Clark.

Comanche holds the 24-hour sailing record for monohulls, covering 618 nmi, for an average of 25.75 knots or 47.69 kmh/h. The boat won line honours in the 2015 Fastnet race and the 2015 Sydney to Hobart Yacht Race, under the leadership of skipper Ken Read. In 2019, under navigator Stan Honey, the yacht won the 2225-mile 50th Transpacific Yacht Race, with a time of 5 days 11 hours 14 minutes 05 seconds. Comanche won the 2017 Sydney to Hobart yacht race, with a time of 1 day 9 hours 15 minutes 24 seconds, a record that still stands today.

At 5 days 14 hours 21 minutes 25 seconds, Comanche holds the Monohull Transatlantic sailing record for the fastest crossing of the Atlantic Ocean, which they achieved on July 28, 2016.

In December 2017, Comanche was sold to Australian Jim Cooney,  and was renamed to LDV Comanche, as part of a one-time sponsorship from SAIC Maxus Automotive Co's LDV''' brand. The yacht later returned to its original, unsponsored title of Comanche. Under this name it won the Sydney-Hobart race again in 2019 in 1 day 18 hours and 30 minutes.

Soon after the completion of the 2019 Sydney-Hobart race, Comanche was reportedly sold to a Russian interest group. Details of the sale have not been disclosed as of yet.

References

External links
Comanche technical details and plans
Comanche on Facebook

Sailing yachts designed by VPLP
2010s sailing yachts
Maxi yachts
Sydney to Hobart Yacht Race yachts